Massueville is a village municipality in Pierre-De Saurel Regional County Municipality, Quebec, Canada. The population as of the Canada 2011 Census was 516.

It is named after Gaspard-Aimé Massue, landowner. Its sister municipality is Saint-Aimé. The town lies the banks of the Yamaska river.

The core of the town is composed of several well kept heritage houses. Massueville had a big fire near the church in an abandoned convent on 27 October 2006.

Demographics 

Population trend:

Mother tongue language (2006)

See also
List of village municipalities in Quebec

References

Villages in Quebec
Incorporated places in Pierre-De Saurel Regional County Municipality